Pseudokuzicus is a genus of Asian bush crickets belonging to the tribe Meconematini: in the subfamily Meconematinae. They are found in Vietnam and southern China.

Species 
The Orthoptera Species File lists the following species, placed in two subgenera:
Subgenus Pseudokuzicus Gorochov, 1993
 Pseudokuzicus acinacus Shi, Mao & Chang, 2007
 Pseudokuzicus furcicaudus (Mu, He & Wang, 2000)
 Pseudokuzicus pieli (Tinkham, 1943) – type species (as Xiphidiopsis pieli Tinkham, 1943)
 Pseudokuzicus platynus Di, Bian, Shi & Chang, 2014
 Pseudokuzicus spinus Shi, Mao & Chang, 2007
 Pseudokuzicus tamdao Gorochov, 1998
 Pseudokuzicus trianglus Di, Bian, Shi & Chang, 2014
Subgenus Similkuzicus Shi, Mao & Chang, 2007
 Pseudokuzicus longidentatus Chang, Zheng & Wang, 1998
 Pseudokuzicus quadridentatus Shi, Mao & Chang, 2007

References 

Tettigoniidae genera
Meconematinae
Orthoptera of Asia